Jared Taylor Odrick (born December 31, 1987) is a former  American football defensive end.  He was drafted by the Miami Dolphins in the first round of the 2010 NFL Draft. He also played for the Jacksonville Jaguars. He played college football at Penn State.

He is now a professional actor in  movies such as Roller Coaster (2015) Filling (2016) and more recently opposite Sylvester Stallone in Samaritan (2022).

High school career
Odrick was a 2005 USAToday, Parade Magazine, and U.S. Army All-American as a senior at Lebanon High School in Lebanon, Pennsylvania. He was named first-team all-state and played in the 2006 Big 33 Football Classic and the 2006 U.S. Army All-American Bowl.

College career
Odrick played sparingly his freshman season with Penn State University, but earned the starting job at defensive tackle in 2007. He would make 16 tackles, with four tackles-for-loss, two sacks, and one blocked kick. In 2008, Odrick started 11 games, earning First-team All-Big Ten honors. He recorded 41 tackles, with 9.5 tackles-for-loss, 4.5 sacks, one forced fumble, and three pass breakups.

Odrick was named an AFCA and CBSSports.com All-American in 2009. He was also named the Big Ten Defensive Player of the Year, the Big Ten Defensive Lineman of the Year, and First-team All-Big Ten by the conference’s coaches,  He is ranked No. 8 in the Big Ten with 6.0 sacks and was fifth on the team with 41 tackles, has 10.0 tackles for loss, with one blocked field goal, one pass break-up and three quarterback hurries.

Professional career

Miami Dolphins
Odrick was drafted by the Miami Dolphins with the 28th overall pick of the 2010 NFL Draft. He signed a five-year, $13 million contract (with $7.1 million guaranteed) with the Dolphins on July 29, 2010. He is represented by Drew Rosenhaus. In October 2010, Jared broke his foot in practice and missed the rest of the season.

In 2011, Odrick had a strong season having an interception and six sacks as a backup defensive end. Odrick became infamous during that season for performing the "Pee-Wee Herman Dance" after recording a sack, reenacting a scene from Pee-Wee's Big Adventure.

Jacksonville Jaguars
Odrick was signed by the Jacksonville Jaguars on March 11, 2015.

Odrick was placed on injured reserve on December 10, 2016, with a shoulder injury.

On February 20, 2017, Odrick was released by the Jaguars.

NFL statistics

Key
 GP: games played
 COMB: combined tackles
 TOTAL: total tackles
 AST: assisted tackles
 SACK: sacks
 FF: forced fumbles
 FR: fumble recoveries
 FR YDS: fumble return yards 
 INT: interceptions
 IR YDS: interception return yards
 AVG IR: average interception return
 LNG: longest interception return
 TD: interceptions returned for touchdown
 PD: passes defensed

Arts & Entertainment

Writing
Odrick has written many articles for a variety of sports publications, including "Football, the flag, and the right to speak our minds," for Sports Illustrated, "Who do you cheer for?", for Sporting News, and most recently "Kneeling to Nike", a critical response to Kaepernick and Nike.

TV & Film

Ballers
In 2015, Odrick made his debut on HBO's Ballers, written by Stephen Levinson and starring Dwayne Johnson. He appeared in four episodes between 2015-2016.

Independent Film Work
Odrick is the executive producer of three short films: "Roller Coaster" (2015), "Filling in" (2016), and "Jade" (2017). He acted in both "Filling in" and "Jade," playing the role of Kevin in the former, and Justin in the latter. He made an appearance in Sylvester Stallone's thriller film, Samaritan which was released in 2022.

Visual Arts

Jaxtaposition
In 2017, Odrick curated an art exhibit in the city of Jacksonville, taking over ten select billboards and juxtaposing local artists' work against commercial advertisements. The contrast between the art and advertisement emphasized "how much we've allowed commercialism to hoard our public viewing space". The project was a collaborative effort with University of North Florida art student, Jenna Sparrow, and the Jaguar's Director of Photography, Everett Sullivan.

References

External links
Jaredodrick.com
Jacksonville Jaguars bio
Penn State Nittany Lions bio
Pro-Football Reference

1987 births
Living people
American football defensive ends
American football defensive tackles
Jacksonville Jaguars players
Miami Dolphins players
Penn State Nittany Lions football players
People from Lebanon, Pennsylvania
Players of American football from Pennsylvania
Sportspeople from Lancaster, Pennsylvania